The following is a sortable list of female classical conductors. Classical conductors work with orchestras, opera companies, ballet companies and choral groups. Conducting orchestras has been called a glass ceiling by the BBC.

References

Links to online resources
 Women conductors, Kapralova Society

 
Classical Conductors